Khairul Amri bin Salehuddin (born 22 December 1989) is a Malaysian footballer who plays as a goalkeeper for Perak in Malaysia Super League.

Club career
Khairul Amri started his professional career in Perak youth teams. He was in the Perak team that competes in the Sukma Games 2008. He made his league debut in 2010, playing against Negeri Sembilan FA. He was also included in the Perak team that competes in the Sukma Games 2010. From 2010 to 2012, he is the third choice goalkeeper in the Perak team, behind Mohd Nasril Nourdin and Kamarul Effandi Abdul Rahim who is the first and the second choice goalkeeper respectively. After both goalkeepers were released from Perak and Mohd Farizal Marlias were brought in at the end of 2012, he was promoted to become second-choice goalkeeper behind Farizal.

In November 2013, Khairul Amri joined Malaysian Premier League side, Penang. Mainly a backup for the national team goalkeeper G. Jeevananthan, Khairul made his debut for the Panthers in place of Jeevanathan in a league match on 7 February 2014.

Khairul Amri returned to Perak for the 2017 season, and were retained in the team for the 2018 season.

References

External links
 

1989 births
Living people
Malaysian people of Malay descent
People from Perak
Malaysian footballers
Perak F.C. players
Penang F.C. players
Association football goalkeepers